Saint David Parish may refer to:

Saint David Parish, Dominica
Saint David Parish, Grenada
Saint David Parish, Jamaica
Saint David Parish, Saint Vincent and the Grenadines
Saint David Parish, Tobago, Tobago
Saint David Parish, New Brunswick

See also
 Saint David (disambiguation)

Civil parishes in the Caribbean
Parish name disambiguation pages